Refsvindinge is a village in central Denmark, located in Nyborg municipality on the island of Funen in Region of Southern Denmark.

History
Refsvindinge Church was built between year 1150–1200.

Refsvindinge was first mentioned in 1435 but founded earlier. A hospital was built in the town in 1716 by the owner of the Juulskov Manor. A shared school between Refsvindinge and Kullerup was built in 1741, also by the owner of Juulskov Manor. A school for just Refsvindinge was later built, in 1759 and another in 1833. The Juulskov School (Danish: Juulskovskolen) was founded in 1965, to be shared between Refsvindinge and Kullerup. It was shut down in 2009.

A brewery was founded in 1885 by H.P. Rasmussen (1858-1951). It still exists today, and is run by the 4th generation of the Rasmussen family.

With the construction of the Faaborg-Ringe-Nyborg railroad, Refsvindinge was a station between Nyborg and Ringe. Refsvindige's history as a railroad station town lasted between 1897–1962. After 1962 the railway no longer transported passengers, and the station was shut down. The station building in Refsvindinge was preserved.

References

Cities and towns in the Region of Southern Denmark
Populated places in Funen
Nyborg Municipality
Villages in Denmark